Ramak Village is the district center of Dih Yak District, Ghazni Province, Afghanistan. It is 30 km east of Ghazni.

See also
 Ghazni Province
 Dih Yak District

References

Populated places in Ghazni Province